Morris Twelve is a model of Morris car introduced without fanfare in the autumn of 1934 as little more than a larger engined Morris Ten Four for which just another £5 was asked. The chassis and body were of the slow-selling longer wheelbase Ten Six. The engine though awarded a tax rating of 11.98 hp had a cubic capacity of 1548cc compared with Morris's 1292cc (10 hp) Ten Four and 1378cc (12.09 hp) Ten Six.

This resulted from the vagaries of the Treasury's tax rating formula which took no account of the length of the engine's stroke. Very long stroke engines such as were given the Twelve provided good low speed torque at the expense of reliability at higher rpm. Such engines were unable to make full use of better fuels and the improved engine breathing techniques that were coming available. Morris briefly promoted the series II car with the note that it performed just like a 14 horsepower car but that brought about a clash from the summer of 1936 when Morris began to supply a six-cylinder 1818cc Morris Fourteen.

While both this new Twelve and the Ten variant Ten Six models appeared in the Morris catalogue for 1935 the slow selling Ten Six was soon dropped. The Twelve remained in production until war intervened and was replaced after the war by the 1476cc but 13½ horsepower Morris Oxford MO.

Each new model showed further integration of the structure of chassis and body. The post-war replacement, Morris Oxford MO, was close to full unitary construction.



Morris Twelve Four

The Morris Twelve Four appeared in the autumn of 1934, probably overshadowed by the promotion of the new model Morris Eight. It was also after three years when it had been sold as a Morris Cowley. When named Cowley it had been available with the Oxford's 1802cc engine as well as the 1548cc engine.

This Twelve shared much with Morris's 1292cc Ten Four and 1378cc Ten Six using the Ten Four gearbox and ratios but with wider wheels and larger section tyres than either of the smaller-engined cars and it used, with modifications, the wheelbase of the Ten Six which was six inches more than the Ten Four. The wheelbase was almost an inch longer than the Ten Six. It also had a fuel tank which held a gallon more than either of the other cars.

Brakes suspension steering
Lockheed hydraulic brakes were fitted on all four wheels, the handbrake on the rear wheels using a mechanical linkage. Suspension was by long semi-elliptic springs at front and rear with Armstrong hydraulic shock absorbers. Steering was by Bishop Cam.

Morris 12 series II

Series II was announced on Friday 17 May 1935 along with a new Ten Four as a kind of extra note tagged to the main Ten Four display advertisement - "You can have a twelve horsepower model for £5 extra".

The series II came with a new longer and lower body with all passengers seated within the wheelbase, narrow windscreen pillars and wide windscreen. Special construction of the body and frame bolted together was designed to produce a strong double box section. New built in luggage accommodation at the rear of the body was accessible by lifting the rear seat's hinged backrest, the previous Twelve had no covered luggage space. An external folding luggage grid was continued from the last car to cope with any extra luggage. The, new to the Twelve, Special coupé continued to have its special inbuilt luggage container. New instrumentation for the driver included an enlarged speedometer. Direction indicators were now concealed within the body and controlled from the steering wheel and given a driver's warning light in the centre of the wheel. The pedals were now mounted directly to the frame (chassis) and free from vibration.

A new three-speed syncromesh gearbox was fitted along with standard Jackall built-in hydraulic jacks and Magna wired wheels. (A 3-speed gearbox produced at least a 25% reduction in anxiety level for most drivers. Suburban streets shivered to the sound of grating gears in pre-syncromesh gearboxes). Easy-clean pressed steel wheels with six-stud fixing became available, initially as an option but in either case they carried 5.75—16 extra low pressure tyres of a smaller section than the previous model. A spare wheel with its tyre was carried in a sunken panel on the back of the car and a steel cover was supplied for it on the dearer sliding head model which also carried toughened glass in its side and rear windows.

Electrical fittings now included a single acting foot-operated switch to dip the headlights and raise them when pressed again. A single electric windscreen wiper mounted on the lower screen rail was supplied to provide clear forward vision in poor weather

Following the 1936 annual Motor Show when no new variations were offered (No Change for Olympia) Morris inserted large display advertisements offering to buyers of all their cars bigger than the Morris Eight a choice of:
 3-speed gearbox and Jackall hydraulic jacks
 or 4-speed gearbox without Jackall hydraulic jacks
 or 4-speed gearbox with Jackall hydraulic jacks at £5 extra
Easyclean wheels optional without extra cost

Three months after they had been first offered as an option —during which 92% of buyers chose the four-speed gearbox— the four-speed gearbox was made standard equipment.

Road test
The Times''' testers said "the four-door six-light body offers ample space for four large persons, neither elbow nor leg room being cramped, there is unusually good headroom." They also reported that passengers were given a high view useful when touring. Entrance to the front seats was regarded as very fair and it was noted that it was possible for the driver to slide in from the near-side. The restricted entrance behind, unless the seats were slid forward, was noted. The whole car's exterior was viewed as "tidy looking" and easy clean wheels were thought to help that attractive appearance. The back axle, it was complained, produced a light hum.

Morris 12 series III

Announced 20 August 1937

A new booted shape with better seating and a new engine was announced in August 1937 and designated series III. The electrical system was now 12-volt. The engine had been introduced to power the Wolseley 12/48 and the MG VA in October 1936 though that did not enter production until mid 1937.

Badged Morris 12 but described in its early brochures as The Morris Twelve-Four (series III) its major advances on the previous 12 were the overhead valve engine, more rounded edges for the shorter smoother new body on a smaller wheelbase and now it had a real boot with outside access to any luggage it held. This new container's nearly ten cubic feet might be amplified by leaving the lid open which then formed a luggage rack. The spare wheel with its tyre was now carried independently below the luggage compartment and fully enclosed. The four-speed gearbox had been given better syncromesh and silent helical type gears for second third and top. Aside from the transmission tunnel the floor was now quite flat without footwells.

Easy-clean pressed steel wheels carried extra low pressure 5.50—16 tyres of a slightly smaller section than previously. Useful conveniences included clearer instrumentation, self-cancelling trafficators and now twin windscreen wipers with remote silent drive and independent operation. There was an automatically actuated stoplight at the back of the car.

Particular care had been taken to ensure draught-free ventilation by scuttle ventilators and hinged rear quarter-lights. The windscreen was hinged at the top for clearer sheltered wet-weather unmisted vision after dark. The front windows were fitted with louvres and, when open, the windows provided an extractor effect at their rear edge. The steering was by Bishop Cam. The rigid axle suspension for both front and rear was controlled by long semi-elliptic springs aided by Armstrong hydraulic dampers.

A Special coupé body, they were features of almost all the Morris range for more than a decade, was no longer available but a "rolling" chassis remained in the catalogue for those who wished to have their car fitted with special coachwork. These very complete chassis kits included wings, running-boards, headlamps, instruments, spare wheel and complete tool kit.

Road testThe Times motoring correspondent declared the car had good room for four occupants and their head clearance, he said, was not unduly low. It was also noted the 4-wheel brakes were hydraulic and used the Lockheed patents. The new engine greatly reduced the need for gear changing. The car was described as commendably stable and the front seat passengers travelled comfortably. However at the back with orthodox front suspension there was more movement but the springing, so far as it went, was good. Steering was a star feature, firm yet light and without wandering or hesitation. About 70 miles an hour could be reached on top gear.

As The Times'' puts it, "the orthodox front suspension", Morris's obsolescent rigid front axle, forced the passengers well back in the car into the six-light saloon shape despite the new-found preference for carrying all passengers "within the wheelbase". Once independent suspension was introduced, which was not in this case until 1948 and the Twelve's Oxford MO replacement, the engine could be right at the front of the car without leaving clearance below it for a rigid front axle.

References

External links

Twelve
Cars introduced in 1934